Mount Adam (Spanish: "Monte Independencia/Monte Beaufort") is a mountain on West Falkland, part of the Hill Cove Mountains range. It is the highest mountain on West Falkland and is the second highest in the islands. It has the remains of glacial cirques on it, and is of similar height to Mount Usborne on East Falkland. It is south west of Mount Edgeworth. The closest settlements are Hill Cove to the North, and Chartres to the South.

As one of the highest mountains of the Falklands, it experienced some glaciation. The handful of mountains over 2,000 feet (610 m) have:

"pronounced corries with small glacial lakes at their bases, morainic ridges deposited below the corries suggest that the glaciers and ice domes were confined to areas of maximum elevation with other parts of the islands experiencing a periglacial climate"

References

 Stonehouse, B (ed.) Encyclopedia of Antarctica and the Southern Oceans (2002)

Adam